Professor Ratbaggy is the debut eponymous album by Australian rock/pop band Professor Ratbaggy and originally released on EMI Records in 1999. "Coma" was released as a single, it was written by band members, Stephen Hadley (bass guitar, backing vocals), Bruce Haymes (keyboards, organ, backing vocals), Paul Kelly (guitar, vocals) and Peter Luscombe (drums) who were all members of Kelly's backing band. "Coma" was remixed by Wicked Beat Sound System.

Track listing
All songs were written by Bruce Haymes, Peter Luscombe, Paul Kelly and Stephen Hadley, except where noted.
 "Please Myself" – 4:17
 "White Trash" – 3:58
 "Can't Fake It" – 5:04
 "Moni, Make It Good" – 3:47
 "Coma" – 4:07
 "Love Letter" (Paul Kelly) – 3:30
 "Blowfly" – 4:56
 "See the Birdie" – 3:53
 "Mannish Woman" – 4:26
 "Rise and Shine" – 4:15
 "Oh Death" – 4:40

Personnel
Professor Ratbaggy
 Stephen Hadley – bass guitar, backing vocals
 Bruce Haymes – keyboards, organ, backing vocals
 Paul Kelly – guitar, vocals
 Peter Luscombe – drums

Production details
Producer – Professor Ratbaggy, Andy Baldwin

Charts

References

1999 debut albums
EMI Records albums
Paul Kelly (Australian musician)